A84 or A-84 may refer to:
 A84 motorway (France)
 A84 road, a major road in Stirling, Scotland
 Dutch Defence, in the Encyclopaedia of Chess Openings